Anna Zawadzka (8 February 1919, Warsaw – 22 June 2004, Warsaw) was a Polish teacher, author of textbooks, Scoutmaster (harcmistrzyni), sister of Tadeusz "Zośka" Zawadzki and daughter of professor and chemist Józef Zawadzki.

During the years 1937-1942 she was a Girl Guides patrol leader.  In 1942-1944 she was the commander of the central Warsaw secret underground Grey Ranks (Szare Szeregi) troop, and took part in the Warsaw Rising in 1944.

After the war she was a teacher of English language and logic at Warsaw University and in high schools. She continued to be an active scout leader until they were forcibly disbanded by the communist government in 1948.  After their reconstitution in the 1980s, she played an active role in reforming the Polish Scouting Association.  In 1990-1993 she was vice-president of the Polish Scouting Association (ZHP). She was the author of a number of articles, including Dzieje harcerstwa żeńskiego w Polsce w latach 1911-1949 (History of the Girl Scout movement in Poland 1911-1949).

She died on 22 June 2004 in Warsaw and is buried in the Powązki cemetery.

1919 births
2004 deaths
Schoolteachers from Warsaw
Burials at Powązki Cemetery
Polish resistance members of World War II
Polish Scouts and Guides
Female resistance members of World War II
University of Warsaw alumni
Warsaw Uprising insurgents
Polish female soldiers
20th-century Polish women